Jennifer Hansen is an Australian journalist and former news presenter on Network 10's Ten News in Melbourne. Alongside Mal Walden, the pair made history as the longest serving duo presenting news in Australia. 

She has also been a newsreader and co-host on The More Music Breakfast Show with Mike Perso on smoothfm 91.5

Early life and education
Hansen was born in Orbost and raised in suburban Melbourne; the psychologist Margot Prior was her stepmother and she had seven siblings and half-siblings, including a sister who died in infancy. She attended Firbank Girls' Grammar School and graduated from the University of Melbourne with an Arts degree in English literature and criminology, and later studied professional writing and editing at RMIT University.

Career
While a student in the late 1980s, Hansen worked as a reporter at two newspapers, The Southern Cross and the Sunday Observer, and joined Network 10, where in 1995 she became a news presenter on Ten News. She co-hosted the Melbourne evening news broadcast with Mal Walden until leaving the network in January 2006. 

In 2007, she was falsely rumoured to have been killed in an on-set accident during the production of the film Prey, in which she had a small role. 

Hansen subsequently worked as a news presenter for the ABC during the 2008 Summer Olympics, and wrote for the Herald Sun.

In March 2014, Hansen joined Mike Perso as a newsreader and co-host of The More Music Breakfast Show on smoothfm 91.5, In December 2022, Jennifer announced her resignation from smoothfm 91.5 after nine years with the station.  

In 2019, Hansen became ambassador for Hope Street Youth and Family Services in Melton.

Writing
Hansen's first novel, Making Headlines, was published in 2016.

Personal life
Hansen is married to actor Alan Fletcher; they have a son and a daughter.

References

External links
Official website

Living people
Year of birth missing (living people)
21st-century Australian journalists
Australian women journalists
University of Melbourne alumni
RMIT University alumni
20th-century Australian journalists
Television personalities from Melbourne
Journalists from Melbourne
People educated at Firbank Girls' Grammar School